Three Rivers High School can be:

Three Rivers Academy, formerly Three Rivers High School, Trois-Rivières, Quebec, Canada
Three Rivers High School (Michigan), Three Rivers, Michigan, United States
Three Rivers High School (Texas), Three Rivers, Texas, United States

Other uses
Three Rivers Academy, Surrey, England, UK; a high school

See also
Three Rivers (disambiguation)